Bythiospeum garnieri is a species of very small freshwater snails that have an operculum, aquatic gastropod molluscs in the family Hydrobiidae.

This species is endemic to France.

References

Hydrobiidae
Bythiospeum
Endemic molluscs of Metropolitan France
Gastropods described in 1889
Taxonomy articles created by Polbot